Tregonce is a hamlet in the parish of St Issey, Cornwall, England, United Kingdom. It is one mile southeast of Padstow on the eastern side of  Little Petherick Creek in the Camel Estuary AONB.

References

Hamlets in Cornwall